Daniel John Cramer (born October 31, 1985) is an American retired mixed martial artist. A professional from 2009 until 2014, Cramer made his professional debut with the Ultimate Fighting Championships (UFC) and was a competitor on SpikeTV's The Ultimate Fighter: Team Rampage vs Team Forrest. However, Cramer is perhaps best remembered for his 10-fight stint for Bellator. His Twitter name is @dancrameratt.

Biography
Cramer graduated from Bethel High School, in his hometown of Bethel, Connecticut, in 2003. Cramer then attended the University of Connecticut, where he earned a bachelor’s degree in economics. While attending college, he played on the rugby team and was captain of the hockey team. After graduating, Cramer was employed as a manager for a local country club.

Mixed martial arts career
Cramer began training Brazilian Jiu Jitsu at the age of sixteen.  He later started his mixed martial arts training with the American Top Team of Connecticut and Best Way Brazilian Jiu Jitsu led by Luigi Mondelli, a five time Pan Am Jiu Jitsu champion.

Before being on The Ultimate Fighter, Cramer held a 3-0 amateur record.  After the filming of The Ultimate Fighter, Cramer moved to Coconut Creek, Florida to train with the main American Top Team academy.

The Ultimate Fighter
Cramer was a contestant on the seventh season of The Ultimate Fighter. In order for the fighters to make it on the show, they had to win an elimination fight. Cramer won his elimination round fight against Jeremiah Riggs via unanimous decision. Cramer was selected to be a part of Team Rampage.

Cramer then defeated Luke Zachrich by technical knockout in the second round.  In the semi-final matchup, Cramer was paired off against Team Forrest's first pick, Tim Credeur.  Credeur submitted Cramer with a heel hook to end Cramer's run in the tournament. After the fight, Cramer said he made a rookie mistake and he should have won the fight.

Ultimate Fighting Championship
Cramer was set to make his debut at The Ultimate Fighter: Team Rampage vs Team Forrest Finale against former castmate Cale Yarbrough. Cramer broke his collar bone and was forced to withdraw from the fight.

In Cramer's professional MMA and UFC debut, he defeated Matt Arroyo at UFC 94: St. Pierre vs. Penn 2, and won the fight by split decision. The judges scored the fight (29-28, 28-29, 29-28).

Cramer next fought his former Ultimate Fighter castmate Matthew Riddle at UFC 101.  He lost the bout by unanimous decision. The judges scored the bout 29-27, 30-26 and 30-27. Cramer was cut from the UFC after his loss to Riddle.

Bellator Fighting Championships
After leaving the UFC, Cramer recorded a pair of wins before he signed to fight Dennis Olson in a middleweight contest that took place at Bellator 15. Cramer dominated the bout, and won via unanimous decision with all three judges giving him a 30-27 win.

Cramer fought fellow TUF alumnus, Dante Rivera, for a one-off show from Bellator at Great Adventure in New Jersey. After three very close rounds, the fight went to the judges and Rivera was awarded the win via split decision (30-27, 30-27, 28-29). Judge Doug Crosby was the only dissenting voice on the cards, scoring the fight 29-28 to Cramer. Many spectators believed Cramer won, even booing the hometown favorite Rivera.

He returned to Bellator for its last season three event, Bellator 34, against Igor Almeida. Cramer defeated Almeida via TKO (cut) at 2:36 of round one. That was Cramer's first professional win via stoppage.

At Bellator 39, Cramer fought Greg Rebello at the Mohegan Sun casino in Uncasville, Connecticut. He won via unanimous decision.

Cramer made his fourth Bellator appearance at Bellator 46 against Josh Samman. Cramer controlled the entirety of the fight, and won the fight via unanimous decision. Cramer brought his undefeated Bellator record to 4-0.

Cramer was expected to fight John Clarke on August 20, 2011 in Uncasville, Connecticut at Bellator 48. This was Cramer's fifth Bellator appearance.  Clarke, however, withdrew due to an injury and Cramer faced newcomer Jeff "The Wolfman" Nader. Cramer dominated the fight throughout two rounds before losing via TKO in the third round.

At Bellator 63, Cramer rematched Jeff "The Wolfman" Nader on the preliminary portion of the card. The event took place March 30, 2012 in Uncasville, Connecticut.  He won the fight via split decision.

Cramer defeated Joe Lamoureux at Bellator 81 on November 16, 2012 via KO in round one.

Bellator MMA announced Cramer as a competitor in the Season Eight Middleweight tournament, at Bellator 89 Cramer defeated Brian Rogers via unanimous decision in the Quarterfinal bout. He faced Brett Cooper in the semifinals on March 7, 2013 at Bellator 92.  Despite winning the first two rounds, Cramer lost via TKO in the third round.

Cramer was then expected to face Perry Filkins at Bellator 98 on September 7, 2013 in the quarterfinals of Bellator's Season Nine Middleweight Tournament. Cramer,  however, withdrew from the bout and was replaced with Jeremy Kimball. Cramer was expected to face Doug Marshall at Bellator 115 on April 4, 2014 in Bellator's Season Ten Middleweight Tournament. Marshall pulled out due to a current suspension and was replaced by Jeremy Kimball. However, Kimball missed weight prior to the bout and the fight was cancelled.

Cramer faced Perry Filkins at Bellator 123 on September 5, 2014. He won the fight via unanimous decision.

Mixed martial arts record

|-
|Win
|align=center|11–4
|Perry Filkins
|Decision (unanimous)
|Bellator 123
|
|align=center|3
|align=center|5:00
|Uncasville, Connecticut, United States
|
|-
|Loss
|align=center|10–4
|Brett Cooper
|TKO (punches)
|Bellator 92
|
|align=center|3
|align=center|3:19
|Temecula, California, United States
|
|-
|Win
|align=center|10–3
|Brian Rogers
|Decision (unanimous)
|Bellator 89
|
|align=center|3
|align=center|5:00
|Charlotte, North Carolina, United States
|
|-
|Win
|align=center|9–3
|Joe Lamoureux 
|KO (punches)
|Bellator 81
|
|align=center|1
|align=center|3:26
|Kingston, Rhode Island, United States
|
|-
|Win
|align=center|8–3
|Jeff Nader
|Decision (split)
|Bellator 63
|
|align=center|3
|align=center|5:00
|Uncasville, Connecticut, United States
|Return to Middleweight.
|-
|Loss
|align=center|7–3
|Jeff Nader
|TKO (punches)
|Bellator 48
|
|align=center|3
|align=center|1:04
|Uncasville, Connecticut, United States
|Light Heavyweight debut.
|-
|Win
|align=center|7–2
| Josh Samman
|Decision (unanimous)
|Bellator 46
|
|align=center|3
|align=center|5:00
|Hollywood, Florida, United States
|
|-
|Win
|align=center|6–2
| Greg Rebello
|Decision (unanimous)
|Bellator 39
|
|align=center|3
|align=center|5:00
|Uncasville, Connecticut, United States
|
|-
|Win
|align=center|5–2
|Igor Almeida
|TKO (doctor stoppage)
|Bellator 34
|
|align=center|1
|align=center|2:36
|Hollywood, Florida, United States
|
|-
|Loss
|align=center|4–2
|Dante Rivera
|Decision (split)
|Elite MMA Mayhem 1
|
|align=center|3
|align=center|5:00
|Jackson, New Jersey, United States
|
|-
|Win
|align=center|4–1
|Dennis Olson
|Decision (unanimous)
|Bellator 15
|
|align=center|3
|align=center|5:00
|Uncasville, Connecticut, United States
|
|-
|Win
|align=center|3–1
|Ever Nunez
|Decision (unanimous)
|Action Fight League 2
|
|align=center|3
|align=center|5:00
|Hollywood, Florida, United States
|
|-
|Win
|align=center|2–1
|Ron Jackson
|Decision (unanimous) 
|C3 Fights 18
|
|align=center|3
|align=center|5:00
|Red Rock, Oklahoma, United States
|
|-
|Loss
|align=center|1–1
|Matthew Riddle
|Decision (unanimous) 
|UFC 101
|
|align=center|3
|align=center|5:00
|Philadelphia, Pennsylvania, United States
|
|-
|Win
|align=center|1–0
|Matt Arroyo
|Decision (split)
|UFC 94
|
|align=center|3
|align=center|5:00
|Las Vegas, Nevada, United States
|

See also
 List of Bellator MMA alumni

References

External links
 
 
 

1985 births
Living people
American male mixed martial artists
Mixed martial artists from Connecticut
Welterweight mixed martial artists
Middleweight mixed martial artists
Mixed martial artists utilizing Brazilian jiu-jitsu
People from Bethel, Connecticut
Bethel High School (Connecticut) alumni
University of Connecticut alumni
Ultimate Fighting Championship male fighters
American practitioners of Brazilian jiu-jitsu